Australian singer and songwriter Pete Murray has released seven studio albums, one extended play, and twenty-six singles (including one as part of a charity collective).

Albums

Studio albums

Compilation albums

Video albums

Extended plays

Singles

As lead artist

Notes

Charity singles

References

Discographies of Australian artists
Rhythm and blues discographies
Pop music discographies